Bebe and Me is the 25th season of Daisy Siete offering produced by Focus Entertainment and GMA Network.

Daisy Siete welcomes back Rochelle Pangilinan to the 25th season of the drama anthology—through Bebe and Me!

Cast and characters
 Rochelle Pangilinan as Rochelle Plaza
Joonee Gamboa as Marcelo Plaza
Izzy Trazona as Izzy
Mike Tan as Daniel
Edward George as Edward
Lemuel Pelayo as Lemuel Morados
Bobby Andrews

References

See also
Daisy Siete

GMA Network drama series
2010 Philippine television series debuts
2010 Philippine television series endings